Aethes confinis is a species of moth of the family Tortricidae. It was described by Razowski in  1974. It is found in Bulgaria, Ukraine and the eastern Palearctic ecozone.

Adults are on wing in July.

References

confinis
Moths described in 1974
Moths of Europe
Moths of Asia
Taxa named by Józef Razowski